Soul Shadows is the sixteenth solo studio album by the English singer-songwriter Paul Carrack. It was originally released in 2016 on Carrack's own Carrack-UK label.

Carrack's former Squeeze bandmate Chris Difford co-wrote one track.  The album was co-produced by Carrack and long-time associate Peter Van Hooke, who is Carrack's former Mike + The Mechanics bandmate.

Soul Shadows reached #25 on the UK album charts during a six-week chart stay in 2016.  This makes it the highest-charting album of Carrack's solo career, including compilations.

Reception

Lee Zimmerman of Blurt claimed Soul Shadows "reflects the UK rocker’s love for authentic American soul music ... (Carrack) sings with the kind of conviction that would make Al Green, Otis Redding and Wilson Pickett nod their heads with approval."

In a mixed-to-positive review, AllMusic's Stephen Thomas Erlewine says of Soul Shadows that "the real human touch comes from Carrack's voice, which is as warm and easy as ever while also benefiting from the gentle assurance of an old master ... if the songs don't necessarily hook, this certainly is a mellow good time."

Track listing

Personnel
Musicians
 Paul Carrack – vocals, acoustic piano (1, 2, 4, 5, 7, 11), clavinet (1, 5, 8, 9), Hammond organ (1, 2, 3, 5, 6, 8–11), guitars (1–10), bass (1–4, 6–11), vibraphone (1, 2, 3, 7, 11), electric piano (3, 8), melodica (3), drums (3), Wurlitzer electric piano (6, 9), harmonica (6, 7), washboard (7, 10), maracas (10), acoustic guitars (11), baritone guitar (11)
 Jack Carrack – drums (1, 2, 4–10), handclaps (3)
 Peter Van Hooke – percussion (1–9), handclaps (3), drums (11)
 Pee Wee Ellis – saxophones (1, 3, 9, 10), horn arrangements (3)
 Alistair White – trombone (1, 3, 9)
 Paul Spong – trumpet (1, 3, 9)

Orchestra (Tracks 1, 4, 5, 8, 9 & 11)
 Richard Niles – orchestrations (1, 9, 11)
 David Cullen – orchestrations (4, 5, 8)
 Everton Nelson – orchestra leader
 Isobel Griffiths – orchestra contractor 
 Susie Gillis – orchestra contracting assistant 

Brass and woodwinds (4, 5, 8, 11)
 Anna Noakes – alto flute
 Karen Jones – flute
 Andy Wood – bass trombone
 Richard Edwards – tenor trombone
 Mark Nightengale – tenor trombone 
 John Barclay – flugelhorn

Strings
 Ian Burdge – first cello
 Chris Worsey – cello
 Vicky Matthews – cello (1, 9, 11)
 Hugh Webb – harp (4, 5, 8, 11)
 Bill Hawkes – first viola 
 Nick Barr – viola 
 Steve Wright – viola
 Everton Nelson – lead first violin 
 Alison Dods – first violin 
 Oliver Langford – first violin 
 Matthew Ward – first violin 
 Nicky Sweeney – first violin (1, 9, 11)
 Richard George – second lead violin
 Simon Baggs – second violin 
 Chris Tombling – second violin 
 Julian Tear – second violin (1, 9, 11)
 Rose Warren-Green – second violin (1, 9, 11)

Production
 Paul Carrack – producer, engineer
 Peter Van Hooke – producer
 Graham Bonnett – engineer, mixing
 Geoff Foster – string engineer (1, 4, 5, 8, 9, 11)
 Paul Cox – photography
 Ruth Rowland – calligraphy
 Ian Ross – design
 Paul Carrack, Jack Carrack, Peter Van Hooke, Angela Hunnicutt and Dave Robinson – montage photos

References

External links

2016 albums
Paul Carrack albums